Arthur Nicolas Theate (born 25 May 2000) is a Belgian professional footballer who plays as a defender for  club Rennes and the Belgium national team.

Club career

Early years
Theate played youth football for Alliance Melen-Micheroux, Eupen, Genk and Standard Liège. Until reaching the under-14 level, he played as a striker at Eupen. At Genk, he was repositioned as a left winger after the arrival of a new player, after which he moved to the position of left-back and then centre-back. During his time at the Genk youth academy, his future at times looked uncertain, and he was described as being physically tough, but not always refined.

After three years playing for the Genk youth teams, he joined Standard Liège where he also struggled with regular midfielder Damjan Pavlović being played as left-back in the youth team to replace Theate. He soon returned to Genk, where he trained with the first team during the 2019–20 pre-season under head coach Felice Mazzu. After this, however, Theate failed to make the cut and was demoted to the reserves. He returned to Standard in 2019, but barely a year after his return, Standard let him go again.

Oostende
In the summer of 2020, Theate saw no prospects of succeeding at Standard Liège, after which he was offered a trial with Belgian First Division A club Oostende. After a week of practicing with the first team, he was able to convince German coach Alexander Blessin of his abilities. Blessin mainly noticed his explosiveness and power, ideal for his high five-man backline and Gegenpressing tactics. Previously, Theate had not been able to convince Lommel or Lierse Kempenzonen during trials.

In July 2020, he signed a three-year contract with an option with Oostende. Theate made his debut on 10 August 2020 in the Belgian First Division A against Beerschot, featuring in starting line-up. Together with Anton Tanghe he grew into the permanent centre-back duo in the Oostende defence. On 4 October 2020, he scored his first professional goal, heading home a cross against Royal Excel Mouscron putting his team in a good position ahead of their 3–0 victory.

During the winter transfer period of the 2020–21 season, Oostende received an offer for Theate of €5 million from Italian Serie A club Bologna, but the Belgian coastal club refused. In his first season at Oostende, he managed to qualify for European play-offs, but eventually missed out. He missed only one game due to suspension and four matches due to injury, playing the entirety of the other 27 matches.

In the 2021–22 season, Theate did not make an appearance during the first two matchdays pending a possible transfer. On the third matchday of the season, he returned to the starting line-up against Gent. On 22 August 2021, he picked up a red card in his last game for Oostende against his former club Standard. Theate played a total of 40 official matches for Oostende, in which he scored five goals.

Bologna
On 26 August 2021, Theate signed with Serie A club Bologna on initial season-long loan, with a subsequent obligation to buy.

On 18 September 2021, Theate made his Bologna debut against defending champions Inter Milan on the fourth matchday of the season. Theate came on as a substitute in the 74th minute behind 6–0 and headed in the 6–1 final score twelve minutes later. Bologna had started the season with a four-man defense, but after conceding twelve goals in three games, coach Siniša Mihajlović started the game against Lazio on 3 October with five at the back with Theate as left-sided centre-back. This was also his first start for the club. Theate contributed with an assist and a goal in the 3–0 win.

Theate impressed during his season at Bologna, making 31 league appearances in which he scored twice and provided one assist.

Rennes
On 29 July 2022, Theate joined Ligue 1 club Rennes on a four-year deal, for a reported fee of €20 million, making him the most expensive Belgian defender ever, above Thomas Vermaelen's 2014 move from Arsenal to Barcelona for €19 million. Theate was to succeed Nayef Aguerd who had left for West Ham United.

On the first matchday of the 2022–23 Ligue 1 season, Theate made his Rennes debut in the starting lineup against Lorient. He scored an own goal in the 65th minute, which proved to be decisive in the 1–0 loss. On 21 August, Theate scored his first goal for the club against Ajaccio, heading home the 2–1 winner. He also scored in his European debut with a strike from distance against AEK Larnaca in the UEFA Europa League group stage, as Rennes won the game 2–1. In Rennes' 1–0 league win over league leaders Paris Saint-Germain, Theate was praised for shutting down Lionel Messi in a strong performance.

International career
Theate received his first call-up to the senior Belgium squad for the 2021 UEFA Nations League Finals. He made his debut on 16 November 2021 in a World Cup qualifier against Wales.

He was selected for national coach Roberto Martínez's squad ahead of the 2022 FIFA World Cup, but failed to make an appearance as the Red Devils were knocked out of the tournament at the group stages for the first time since 1998.

Career statistics

Club

International

References

External links
 

2000 births
Living people
Belgian footballers
Association football defenders
Belgium youth international footballers
Belgium under-21 international footballers
Belgium international footballers
Belgian Pro League players
Serie A players
Ligue 1 players
K.V. Oostende players
Bologna F.C. 1909 players
Stade Rennais F.C. players
2022 FIFA World Cup players
Belgian expatriate footballers
Expatriate footballers in Italy
Belgian expatriate sportspeople in Italy
Expatriate footballers in France
Belgian expatriate sportspeople in France